First National Bank  may refer to:

Worldwide

Lebanon 

 First National Bank (Lebanon)

Japan
 Dai-Ichi Kangyo Bank, formerly

South Africa
 First National Bank (South Africa)

United States

Banking institutions (existing)
 First National Bank of Florida
 First National Bank of Layton, Utah
 First National Bank of Omaha, Nebraska
 FNB Corporation of Pittsburgh, Pennsylvania

Banking institutions (former)
 First National Bank (Brooksville, Florida)
 First National Bank (Clinton, Iowa)
 First National Bank of Davenport, Iowa
 First National Bank (Iowa Falls, Iowa)
 First National Bank of Mason City, Mason City, Iowa
 First National Bank (Mount Pleasant, Iowa)
 First National Bank (Bolivar, Missouri)
 First National Bank, Hoboken, New Jersey
 First National Bank (Philadelphia), Philadelphia, Pennsylvania
 First National Bank (New Cumberland, West Virginia)
 First National Bank of Arizona, became part of First Interstate Bancorp
 First National Bank of Boston, acquired by Fleet Bank and merged into Bank of America
 First National Bank of Brooklyn, acquired by Bank of the Manhattan Company and merged into JPMorgan Chase
 First National Bank of Charlotte, Charlotte, North Carolina
 First National Bank of Dubuque, merged into US Bancorp
 First National Bank of Minneapolis and First National Bank of St. Paul, Minnesota, now part of US Bank
 First National Bank of New York, now part of Citibank
 First National Bank of Oregon, became part of First Interstate Bancorp
 First National Bank of San Francisco, merged with Crocker National Bank
 First National Bank of Whitestone, acquired by Bank of the Manhattan Company and merged into JPMorgan Chase
 First Bank of the United States, first private central bank of the United States
 First Chicago Bank, formerly First National Bank of Chicago, Illinois
 First Financial Bank, formerly First National Bank of Terre Haute, Indiana
 First Maryland Bancorp, now part of M&T Bank
 PNC Financial Services, formerly First National Bank of Pittsburgh, Pennsylvania
 Regions Bank, formerly First National Bank of Little Rock, Arkansas
 Seafirst Bank or Seattle-First National Bank; acquired by Bank of America
 Security Pacific Bank, formerly Security-First National Bank of Los Angeles, California
 Southeast Banking Corporation, formerly First National Bank of Miami, Florida
 Wachovia Bank of Georgia, formerly First National Bank of Atlanta, Georgia

See also
 First National Bank Building (disambiguation)
 First Bank (disambiguation)
 First National Bank of Boston v. Bellotti